Arthur Percival Penman, usually known by his middle name, (1885–1944) was an Australian cricketer and Australian rugby union representative. A right-handed batsman and right-arm fast bowler, he played first-class cricket for New South Wales in the early 20th century.

Cricket career
Born in New South Wales on 23 January 1885, Penman first played for the New South Wales cricket team in December 1904 in a first-class match against Queensland. He played further matches for New South Wales against Tasmania and Queensland in the same season. The following season he played his last two first-class matches against Queensland and an Australian XI. He never played a match in the Sheffield Shield.

In the mid-1920s, Penman played three matches for the Federated Malay States, two against the Straits Settlements and one against Hong Kong. He died in New South Wales on 11 September 1944.

Rugby union career
Penman was also a rugby union international for Australia, being capped for his country as a fullback in a friendly against New Zealand, at Dunedin, on 2 September 1905.

See also
 List of New South Wales representative cricketers

References

1885 births
1944 deaths
Cricketers from Sydney
Australian cricketers
Federated Malay States cricketers
New South Wales cricketers
Australian rugby union players
Australia international rugby union players
Rugby union players from Sydney
Rugby union fullbacks